Nathaniel is an English variant of the biblical Hebrew name Nathanael.

People with the name Nathaniel

Nathaniel Archibald (1952–2018), American basketball player
Nate Archibald (born 1948), American basketball player
Nathaniel Ayers (born 1951), American musician who is the subject of the 2009 film The Soloist
Nathaniel Bacon (1647–1676), Virginia colonist who instigated Bacon's Rebellion
Nathaniel Prentice Banks (1816–1894), American politician and American Civil War General
Nat Bates (born 1931), two-term mayor of Richmond, California
Nathaniel Berhow (2003–2019), perpetrator of the 2019 Saugus High School shooting in 2019
Nathaniel Bowditch (1773–1838), American mathematician, father of modern maritime navigation
Nathaniel Buzolic (born 1983), Australian actor
Nathaniel Chalobah (born 1994), English footballer
Nathaniel Clayton (1833–1895), British politician
Nat King Cole (1919–1965), American singer and musician
Nathaniel Clyne (born 1991), English footballer
Nathaniel Dell (born 1999), American football player
Nathaniel W. Depee (1812–1868), American abolitionist
Robert Nathaniel Dett (1882–1943), American composer and choir director
 Nathaniel Dwayne Hale (1969–2011), American musician known as Nate Dogg
Nathaniel Erskine-Smith (born 1984), Canadian politician
Nathaniel Fick (born 1977), former US Marine captain
Nathaniel Greene Foster (1809–1869), American politician and military officer
Nathaniel M. Gorton (born 1938), American federal judge
Nathaniel Everett Green (1823–1899), English painter
Nathaniel Greene (journalist) (1797–1877), American journalist
Nathaniel Hackett (born 1979), American football coach
Nathaniel Hawthorne (1804–1864), American novelist
Nathaniel Jarvis (born 1991), Welsh footballer
Nathaniel Bar-Jonah (1957–2008), convicted kidnapper, suspected serial killer and cannibal
Nathaniel Lammons (born 1993), American tennis player
Nathaniel Ledbetter (born c. 1961), American politician
Nathaniel Lee, (c. 1653–1692), English dramatist
Nathaniel Lees, New Zealand actor
Nathaniel Lindley, Baron Lindley (1828–1921), English judge
Nat Lofthouse (1925–2011), English footballer
Nathaniel Lubell (1916–2006), American Olympic fencer
Nathaniel Lyon (1818–1861), U.S. Army general
Nathaniel Miller (born 1979), Canadian water polo player
Nathaniel Moore (1884–1910), American Olympic golfer
Nathaniel Moore (disambiguation), various people
Nathaniel Neale (born 1988), New Zealand Rugby League player
Nathaniel Parker (born 1962), English actor
Nathaniel Pearce (1779–1820), English explorer in Ethiopia
Nathaniel Pearlman (born 1965), American entrepreneur
Nathaniel Peat, British Jamaican social entrepreneur
Nathaniel Peteru (born 1992), New Zealand rugby league footballer
Nathaniel Philbrick (born 1956), American writer
Nathaniel Phillips (born 1997), English footballer
Nathaniel Rateliff (born 1978), American musician
 Nathaniel "Nate" Rathbun (born 1992), American house musician known as Audien
Nathaniel Raymond (born 1977), human rights investigator and anti-torture advocate
Nate Ruess (born 1982), American singer-songwriter
Nathaniel Stern (born 1977), American artist
Nathaniel Walter Swan (1834–1884), Irish-born Australian writer
Nate Thurmond (1941–2016), an American basketball player
Nathaniel Beverley Tucker (1784–1851), American author and Virginia political activist
Nathaniel Wallich (1786–1854), surgeon and botanist
Nathaniel Jarrett Webb (1891–1943), American politician in the Virginia House of Delegates, attorney and coach
Nathaniel White (born 1960), American serial killer
Nathaniel Willemse (born 1985), Australian singer-songwriter
Nat Wolff (born 1994), American actor, musician and singer-songwriter

Fictional characters
Nathaniel Fitzwilliam "Nate" Archibald in the Gossip Girl series
Nathaniel "Natty" Bumppo, the main character in James Fenimore Cooper's novel The Last of The Mohicans
Nathaniel Dusk, comic book character, private investigator
 Nathaniel Essex, alter ego of Mister Sinister, a Marvel Comics supervillain
 Nathaniel "Nate" Fisher, Jr. and his father Nathaniel Fisher, Sr. in the television series Six Feet Under
 Captain Nathaniel Flint from Disney's Treasure Planet
 Nathaniel M. Laxamana, the protagonist of the Filipino TV series Nathaniel
 Nathaniel (surname unknown, also known as John Mandrake), one of the three main protagonists in the Bartimaeus Sequence by Jonathan Stroud
 Captain Nathaniel Renko, main character in the 2010 video game Singularity
Nathaniel Kurtzberg, a character in the animated series Miraculous: Tales of Ladybug and Cat Noir
 Captain Nathaniel Joseph Claw, main character in the 1997 video game Claw

Animals with this name
Nathaniel (horse), winner of the King Edward VII Stakes and King George VI and Queen Elizabeth Stakes

References

English masculine given names
English-language masculine given names
Hebrew masculine given names
Jewish given names
Masculine given names
Modern names of Hebrew origin
Theophoric names